Giriz may refer to:

 Qrız, Azerbaijan
 Giriz, India, see St. Francis Xavier's Church, Giriz